A wicker man was purportedly a large wicker statue in which the druids (priests of Celtic paganism) sacrificed humans and animals by burning. The main evidence for this practice is a sentence by Roman general Julius Caesar in his Commentary on the Gallic War (1st century BC), which modern scholarship has linked to an earlier Greek writer, Poseidonius.

There is some archaeological evidence of human sacrifice among Celtic peoples, although it is rare. The ancient Greco-Roman sources are now regarded somewhat skeptically, considering it is likely they "were eager to transmit any bizarre and negative information" about the Celts, as it benefited them to do so.

The British horror film The Wicker Man (1973) brought the wicker man into popular culture. In recent times, a wicker man (without human or animal sacrifices) has been burned at some neopagan ceremonies, and festivals such as Burning Man. It has also been referenced in music and art.

Ancient accounts

While other Roman writers of the time described human and animal sacrifice among the Celts, only the Roman general Julius Caesar and the Greek geographer Strabo mention the wicker man as one of many ways the druids of Gaul performed sacrifices. In the mid-1st century BC, Caesar wrote in his Commentary on the Gallic War that a large wickerwork figure with limbs was filled with living men and set on fire. He says that criminals were the preferred victims, but that innocent people might also be burned if there were no criminals. Writing slightly later, Strabo says in his Geographica that men and animals were burned in a large figure of wood and straw, although he does not make clear whether the victims were burned alive. He adds that the ashes were believed to help the crops grow. 

Also in the 1st century BC, Greek historian Diodorus Siculus wrote in Bibliotheca historica that the Celts sacrificed human and animal captives by burning them on huge pyres along with the first fruits. It has been suggested that both Diodorus and Strabo got their information from the earlier Greek historian Posidonius, whose work has not survived.

In the 1st century AD, Roman writer Lucan mentioned human sacrifices to the Gaulish gods Esus, Toutatis and Taranis. In a commentary on Lucan—the Commenta Bernensia dating from the 4th century and later—an unnamed author added that sacrifices to Taranis were burned in a wooden container.

There is some archaeological evidence of human sacrifice among Celtic peoples, although it is rare. There is also evidence of Celtic animal sacrifice, sometimes by burning. Some modern historians and archaeologists stress that the ancient Greco-Roman accounts should be viewed with caution, as Greeks and Romans "had good reason to dislike a long-term enemy" and it may have benefited them to "transmit any bizarre and negative information" about the Celts. Their desire to depict Celtic peoples as "barbarians" may have "led to exaggeration or even fabrications".

Modern

There are accounts of large wickerwork figures being burnt in France during the 18th and 19th centuries. Wilhelm Mannhardt recorded that a wickerwork giant was burnt each Midsummer Eve in Brie. Until 1743, a large wickerwork figure of a soldier or warrior was burnt every 3 July on the Rue aux Ours in Paris, as the crowd sang "Salve Regina". At Luchon in the Pyrenees, snakes were burnt alive in a tall wickerwork column decked with leaves and flowers on Midsummer Eve. Young men with torches danced around the burning column, and the townsfolk and clergy sang hymns. An Englishman who watched the ceremony in 1890 said the figure was somewhat "shaped like a mummy" and stood about 20 feet tall.

The British horror film The Wicker Man (1973) brought the wicker man into modern popular culture. In recent times, a wicker man (without human or animal sacrifices) has been burnt at some neopagan ceremonies, folk festivals, as well as festivals such as Burning Man in the United States and the former Wickerman Festival in Scotland.

In Northern Portugal, the traditional Caretos Festival ends with the burning of a gigantic human effigy with horns while young people run around it.

See also

 Beltane
 Bonfire
 Willow Man
 Burning Man
 Burning of Judas
 Giubiana
 Guy Fawkes Night
 Zozobra

References

External links

 Caesar, De Bello Gallico, English translation by W. A. McDevitte and W. S. Bohn (1869); Latin text edition, from the Perseus Project
 Project Gutenberg text for Frazer's The Golden Bough

Celtic mythology
Druidry
Rituals
Modern pagan beliefs and practices
Human sacrifice
Traditions involving fire